Atwal is a Jat clan and a family name of Sikhs.

Notable people
Notable people with the surname, who may or may not be affiliated with the clan, include:
Arjun Atwal, Indian golfer
A. S. Atwal, Indian police officer
Charanjit Singh Atwal, Indian politician 
Harjeet Atwal, British Punjabi writer
Inder Iqbal Singh Atwal, Indian politician
Jaspal Atwal, Canadian businessman

References

Surnames
Sikh names
Punjabi-language surnames